Dağ Tumas is a village in the Jabrayil District of Azerbaijan.

History 
The village was located in the Armenian-occupied territories surrounding Nagorno-Karabakh, coming under the control of ethnic Armenian forces in August 1993 during the First Nagorno-Karabakh War. The village subsequently became part of the breakaway Republic of Artsakh as part of its Kashatagh Province, referred to as Tovmasar. It was recaptured by Azerbaijan on 23 October 2020 during the Lachin offensive in the 2020 Nagorno-Karabakh war.

References

External links 
 

Populated places in Jabrayil District
Former Armenian inhabited settlements